The tennis tournament at the 2011 Southeast Asian Games was held from November 13 to November 21 at the Jakabaring Sport Complex in Palembang in Indonesia. It was the 26th edition of tennis event at the Southeast Asian Games.

Medal summary

Medalists

References

External links
SEAG2011 Start/Result Lists - Tennis

 
2011 Southeast Asian Games events
2011
Southeast Asian Games